Oakey Creek is a rural locality in the Rockhampton Region, Queensland, Australia. In the  Oakey Creek had a population of 3 people.

Geography 
The Burnett Highway enters the locality from the north-east (Walmul) and exits to the south (Wura).

History

In the  Oakey Creek had a population of 3 people.

Heritage listings 
Oakey Creek has the following heritage-listed sites:
 remains of the Adolphus William Copper Smelter

Education 
There are no schools in Oakey Creek. The nearest government primary and secondary schools are Mount Morgan State School and Mount Morgan State High School, both in Mount Morgan to the north-east.

References

Suburbs of Rockhampton Region
Localities in Queensland